= Steve Rieger =

American politician

Member of the Alaska Senate
- In office 1993–1996

Member of the Alaska House of Representatives from the 11 district
- In office 1985–1990

Personal details
- Born: May 14, 1952 (age 74) Pullman, Washington, U.S.
- Party: Republican
- Education: Harvard College (BS); Harvard Business School (MBA)

Steve Rieger (born May 14, 1952) is an American politician. He served as a Republican member of the Alaska Senate.

== Life and career ==
Rieger was born in Pullman, Washington.

Rieger served in the Alaska Senate from 1993 to 1996 and the Alaska House of Representatives from 1985 to 1990.
